Lara Peyrot (born May 2, 1975) is an Italian cross-country skier who competed in the 1990s and 2000s.

Peyrot was born in Pinerolo and lives in Prali-Ghigo.

Cross-country skiing results
All results are sourced from the International Ski Federation (FIS).

World Cup

Season standings

Team podiums
 1 podium

References

External links
 

Italian female cross-country skiers
1975 births
Living people
People from Pinerolo
Sportspeople from the Metropolitan City of Turin